Homeobox protein Meis1 is a protein that in humans is encoded by the MEIS1 gene.

Function 

Homeobox genes, of which the most well-characterized category is represented by the HOX genes, play a crucial role in normal development. In addition, several homeoproteins are involved in neoplasia. This gene encodes a homeobox protein belonging to the TALE ('three amino acid loop extension') family of homeodomain-containing proteins.

Interactions 

MEIS1 has been shown to interact with PBX1 and HOXA9.

References

Further reading

External links 
 

Transcription factors